Michael Rudroff (born 28 December 1960) is a German former professional Grand Prix motorcycle road racer.

Rudolf competed in his first Grand Prix in 1987, and made one podium; coming third in the 1989 Nations Grand Prix. His career ranged from 1987 until 1996, where he started in 53 races, though he never started from pole position.

Career
Rudroff, riding a Honda bike, appeared in two Grand Prix in 1987, the West Germany Grand Prix and the Austrian Grand Prix where he qualified in positions 38 and 26 but did not compete in the final race. He raced in the West German, Dutch TT and Yugoslavian Grand Prix in 1988, completing 28 laps in the first and coming in at 15th having started at 24th, completing 20 laps and coming in at 19th having started in 31st, and failing to qualify for the race in Yugoslavia.

1989 saw regular appearances for Rudroff, racing in the Australian Grand Prix where he came 15th from a starting position of 21, followed by the United States Grand Prix where he came 15th one more having started again at 21. Following the Spanish Grand Prix, where he came 20th having begun at 23, he raced in the Nations Grand Prix. He began at 24, and finished 3rd in 59 minutes, 53.630 seconds over 33 laps. This was the only podium in his career. He raced in West Germany, Austria, Yugoslavia, Netherlands and the Czechoslovakian Grand Prix later that year. He ended the season with 18 championship points.

Rudolf competed in three rounds of the 1990 Superbike World Championship aboard a Bimota. He returned to Grand Prix competition in 1991, where he competed in 10 races, and one other race in which he was not classified. This included a season-best 11th in the Australian Grand Prix, and he enjoyed a career-best 26 championship points. He made 13 more starts in 1992, now on a Harris Yamaha, but only returned three points despite coming 8th at the British Grand Prix. In 1993 he made 14 appearances again on the Yamaha, returning 17 points despite falling out of the Australian Grand Prix and of the Japanese Grand Prix in the first lap. He was not seen again on the race track until 1996, where he raced once in the German Grand Prix on a Suzuki bike and fell at the first lap.

Career statistics

Grand Prix motorcycle racing

Races by year
(key) (Races in bold indicate pole position) (Races in italics indicate fastest lap)

Superbike World Championship

Races by year
(key) (Races in bold indicate pole position) (Races in italics indicate fastest lap)

References

External links
 Michael Rudroff from MotoGP.com
 World Superbike Rider Profile

1960 births
Living people
German motorcycle racers
500cc World Championship riders
Superbike World Championship riders